The men's 61 kg competition at the 2018 World Weightlifting Championships was held on 1–3 November 2018.

Schedule

Medalists

Records

Results

New records

References

External links
Results 
Results Group A 
Results Group B
Results Group C

Men's 61 kg